Can't Stop is a demo album featuring music recorded by American singer Ashanti. The album was first released in 2004 and then on January 25, 2006 in United States. It was re-released multiple times under different labels throughout 2007. It was released on May 31, 2012 for digital download in United Kingdom only.

Background and release
"Can't Stop" features material that Ashanti (born Ashanti Douglas) recorded on July 15, 1997. The tapes resurfaced in September 2004 and was re-mixed and mastered by Genard Parker and Ernie Lake.
 
Ashanti claims she recorded the material for demo-shopping purposes and never intended the recordings to be released to the public.

"I was just a teenager following my dreams when I signed with Parker. Me and my mother went to his house to work on some songs hoping to launch my career. Genard couldn't deliver for me and he signed a release permitting me to go to another record company."

Further, on two of the tracks she only sings background vocals, while on another she is not performing at all.

Ashaniti filed suit to stop distribution. In addition to Genard Parker (and possibly Ernie Lake), Big Records Australia, Farm Records, Unique Corp., Simply Vinyl, Team Entertainment, ZYX Music and others are named as defendants in the lawsuit. The album has a street date of February 21, 2005.

Lawsuit
Genard Parker, sued Ashanti for breach of contract and the jury awarded $630,000. When Ashanti got a record deal, he let her out of the contract she signed with him, with the understanding that he'd get to produce some songs for her and earn royalties. Although the jury took Parker’s side, they didn’t give him everything he asked for. He had sued Ashanti for $2.2 million. Of the $630,000 awarded by the jury, US District Judge Jed Rakoff rejected all but $50,000 of the award on the grounds that the jurors did not have adequate facts to determine damages so they were left to speculate. Ashanti sought an injunction to block the release and damages in excess of $1 million. September 19, 2006, Ashanti has settled a lawsuit with her first producer, Genard Parker, out of court on Tuesday, dropping all litigation in their contract dispute.

Track listing

US standard edition
"Can't Stop" – 4:01
"Come 2 Me" – 3:52
"More Than a Melody" – 4:49
"You Don't Have 2 Love Me" – 4:50 (performed by Kenny Greene)
"Believe" – 4:17
"Don't Ever Let Me Go" – 3:47
"It's About Time" – 3:52
"Baby Baby" – 4:00
"You Always Seem to Make Me Feel" – 3:41
"By My Side (Prelude)" – 3:26
"Baby Baby" (Red Rhythm Radio Mix) – 3:53

Japanese edition
"Can't Stop" – 4:01
"Come 2 Me" – 3:52
"More Than a Melody" – 4:49
"You Don't Have 2 Love Me" – 4:50 (performed by Kenny Greene)
"Believe" – 4:17
"Don't Ever Let Me Go" – 3:47
"It's About Time" – 3:52
"Baby Baby" – 4:00
"You Always Seem to Make Me Feel" – 3:41
"By My Side (Prelude)" – 3:26
"Baby Baby (Remix)"
"Can't Stop (Remix)"
"You Don't Have 2 Love Me (Remix)"	
"Believe [Smoker Remix]"

Personnel

Ashanti – primary artist
Anna Blightman – project coordinator
Simon Britton – producer, remixing
Dave Cintron – multi instruments, producer, programming, remixing
Jocelyn McElroy – writing, background vocals
Kenny Greene – composer
Adam Kudzin – composer, multi instruments, producer
Ernie Lake – producer
Gene Lake – producer
Aaron Lindsey – composer

James Loughrey – digital editing, mixing
Ulf Magnusson – photography
Richard Mayes – executive producer, project director
Genard Parker – executive producer, multi instruments, producer, programming, vocal arrangement
Red Rhythm – remixing
Parkes Stewart – composer
Steve Thompson – producer
Mike Warner – multi instruments, producer
Kyle West – multi instruments
Darin Whittington – composer, producer
Kurt Woodley – A&R, arranger, engineer

Credits for Can't Stop adapted from AllMusic.

Release history

References

Bibliography
 

2006 compilation albums
Ashanti (singer) albums
Demo albums